The women's discus throw competition at the 2012 Summer Olympics in London, United Kingdom was held at the Olympic Stadium on 3–4 August. Each athlete received three throws in the qualifying round. All who achieved the qualifying distance progressed to the final. If less than twelve athletes were to achieve this mark, then the twelve furthest throwing athletes would reach the final. Each finalist is allowed three throws in last round, with the top eight athletes after that point being given three further attempts.

Eight automatic qualifiers were achieved in the qualifying round, all but one exceeding the minimum by half a meter.  Darya Pishchalnikova, Nadine Müller and Sandra Perković made it in their first attempt, while Yarelys Barrios hit the top qualifier 65.94 in her second throw after fouling the first. It took 62.47 to make the final.

In the final, Nadine Müller took the lead in the first round, while defending champion Stephanie Brown Trafton, who surprised everyone with her first round throw four years earlier, only managed the fifth best throw of the first round this time, and that turned out to be her best effort. In the second round, Li Yanfeng took the lead with 67.22. Previous silver medalist Yarelys Barrios followed with the second best throw of the competition 66.38. These positions lasted only until Sandra Perković threw 68.11 to assume the lead she would not relinquish. Her third round throw was a Croatian national record 69.11, solidifying her hold on the gold medal. Taking no follow through, she stood in the ring talking to the discus throughout its flight. In the fourth round, Darya Pishchalnikova edged into the bronze medal position with 66.42, then in the fifth round secured the silver medal with 67.56.

It was later announced that Pishchalnikova tested positive for the anabolic steroid oxandrolone in the samples taken in May 2012. On April, 2013 she was banned by the Russian Athletics Federation for ten years, and her results from May 2012 were annulled, meaning she was set on track to lose her Olympic medal.

Schedule
All times are British Summer Time (UTC+1)

Records
, the existing World and Olympic records were as follows.

Qualifying round
Entrants as of 27 July 2012.

Qual. rule: qualification standard 63.00 m (Q) or at least best 12 qualified (q).

Final 

 Entrants as of 3 August 2012.

Darya Pishchalnikova, who had been originally awarded the silver medal, had been tested positive for the anabolic steroid oxandrolone and her medal and record were revoked.

References

Athletics at the 2012 Summer Olympics
Discus throw at the Olympics
2012 in women's athletics
Women's events at the 2012 Summer Olympics